Moshoeshoe may refer to:
 Moshoeshoe I (-1870), paramount chief of southern Sotho; founder of Basuto kingdom (later Basutoland, then Lesotho)
 Moshoeshoe II of Lesotho (1938-1996), king of Lesotho

See also
 Letsie I Moshoeshoe of Lesotho (1811-1891), paramount chief of Basotho (modern Lesotho) 1870-1891
 Moshoeshoe I International Airport, Lesotho